Errika Prezerakou (born 8 March 1975 in Nea Filadelfeia) is a former Greek pole vaulter.

Biography
Her personal best was 4.25 metres, a height she cleared both outdoor (in Athens 2003) and indoor (in Paiania, 2003). She qualified for the Olympic Games of Athens 2004, but did not compete due to a serious leg injury. Her career was interrupted in 2007 due to another serious injury while preparing for the 2008 Olympic Games in Beijing.

In 2010, she won the Greek reality show Dancing with the Stars. She was also a judge for the second edition. In 2020, she is a contestant of the third season of the greek talent show Just the 2 of Us.

Progression

Outdoor

Indoor

References

External links
 IAAF profile for Errika Prezerakou
 
 Official site

1975 births
Living people
Greek female pole vaulters
Athletes from Athens
Dancing with the Stars winners